Jon Foster (born August 3, 1984) is an American actor and musician. His films include the drama The Door in the Floor (2004), the horror film Stay Alive (2006), the thriller Brotherhood (2010), and the drama Rampart (2011). Foster is a co-founder of the electronic-soul duo Kaneholler, with his wife, Chelsea Tyler who is the daughter of musician and singer Steven Tyler.

Early life
Foster was born on August 3, 1984 in Boston the son of restaurant owners Gillian and Steven Foster. He has an older brother, Ben Foster, who is also an actor; Ben has described their parents as "free-spirited, Vietnam-protesting hippies". His paternal grandparents were Celia (Segal) and A. (Abraham) Frank Foster, a prominent judge and politician in Boston; their families were Jewish immigrants from the Russian Empire.
 His family relocated to Fairfield, Iowa after their Boston home was burgled while they were present.

Personal life
On June 20, 2015, Foster married Chelsea Tyler, daughter of musician Steven Tyler and the sister of actress Liv Tyler. The two formed the electronic-soul band Kaneholler. On February 21, 2020, they welcomed their first child, a son named Vincent Frank Foster.

Filmography

References

External links

 

1984 births
20th-century American male actors
21st-century American male actors
21st-century American musicians
American male film actors
American male television actors
American people of Russian-Jewish descent
Jewish American male actors
Living people
Male actors from Boston
Male actors from Iowa
Musicians from Boston
Musicians from Iowa
People from Fairfield, Iowa
21st-century American male musicians
21st-century American Jews